Hermann Kindle (born 14 June 1935), is a Liechtensteiner former alpine skier who competed in the 1956 Winter Olympics and in the 1960 Winter Olympics.

References

External links
 

1935 births
Living people
Liechtenstein male alpine skiers
Olympic alpine skiers of Liechtenstein
Alpine skiers at the 1956 Winter Olympics
Alpine skiers at the 1960 Winter Olympics